Moran Bluff  is a steep coastal bluff close west of Mathewson Point on the north side of Shepard Island, along the edge of Getz Ice Shelf, Antarctica. The name was applied by the Advisory Committee on Antarctic Names for Gerald F. Moran, U.S. Navy, a construction mechanic who overwintered at McMurdo Station in 1965 and Plateau Station in 1968, and worked at Byrd Station, summer season 1969–70.

References

Cliffs of Marie Byrd Land